The EAST  Initiative is an educational non-profit that oversees and trains for a school program, EAST, that operates primarily in the United States.

The program began in 1995 in Arkansas. It offers students and teachers professional technology and software for use in a loosely  structured, self-driven environment.

EAST training (student) 
EAST students routinely receive training from accomplished professionals in the fields that they represent. Student training is primarily intended to educate students on technology groups while offering a team environment in which to learn. While slots are limited, an effort is made to accommodate all students who wish to attend. As of April, 2005, students have the following course opportunities (variability within programs is common):

Technology training:
 Microsoft Operating Systems/Windows Server Management 
 GIS/GPS (Geographic Information System/Global Positioning System) with Trimble, ESRI, and Intergraph
 Introductory GIS/GPS 
 Geospatial Projects 
 Advanced Vector analysis and Visualization 
 Advanced Cartography 
 Advanced Image processing and Visualization 
 3D Animation with Softimage XSI (introductory and advanced)
 Architectural Design with Bentley's MicroStation 
 PC Upgrade and repair 
 Microsoft Visual Basic and Visual Studio (introductory and advanced) 
 Website design with Adobe Systems (Dreamweaver, Flash, and Fireworks) 
 Photo editing with Adobe Photoshop
 Digital Video Editing with Final Cut Pro system 
 Music Editing with FL Studio
 3D modeling and engineering with Solid Edge from UGS

Online course offerings:
 EAST Geospatial Virtual Camp 
 School Mapping Project 
 ESRI Virtual Campus

Students experience many different types of software/hardware, including (as taken from the EAST website):

 CAD/solid modeling/visualization:
 AutoCAD, ArchiCAD, SketchUp Pro, Solid Edge, etc.

 3D animation:
 Maya, 3DS Max, Blender, etc.

 Programming/coding:
 Arduino, Pi-Top, Xcode, Visual Studio, etc.

 GPS/GIS:
 ArcMap, ArcGlobe, ArcGIS.com, Garmin GLO, etc.

 Video/photography/graphics:
 DSLR Cameras, GoPro Cameras, Professional Video Cameras, Ricoh Theta S, Audio Kit, Lighting and Green Screen Kit, Tripods, Adobe Creative Cloud, Final Cut Pro X, Oculus Rift Kit (including Oculus VR Headset), 3D Scanners, Vinyl Cutters, etc.

 Music composition/production:
 FL Studio Signature Edition, Blue Yeti Pro, MIDI Keyboard with Drum Pad, etc.

 Servers and computers:
 Windows Server, Workstations & Laptops, Oculus Workstation, Apple iMac Workstations, Apple MacBook Pro Laptop, etc.

 Mobile devices:
 Apple iPad, Android Tablet, Printers, 3D Printers, Plotter, All-in-One Printer, Color Printer, Laser Cutters, etc.

 Video/presentations:
 Apple TV, Chromecast, Flat Screen TV, etc.

 Productivity:
 Microsoft Office Suite

Project-based learning 
EAST students are expected (and in many cases required) to generate an idea for a project which helps the community or school that acts as host to the lab; after the brainstorming process, individual and group plans of action are constructed and refined. This is the process in which the facilitator plays the largest direct role, as supervisor and mentor — when the actual projects begin, the facilitator's primary role changes to that of observer and supporter. Projects vary in goal and method of execution, but share the same central philosophy: with motivation, encouragement, and access to professional technology, students are capable of great things.

EAST Conference 
The culmination of any given EAST project can be seen at the annual EAST Conference, traditionally held in the spring. The Conference brings together teams and projects from all participating schools with the purpose of allowing students to demonstrate what they've accomplished and learn from one another. In the formative years of the EAST program, projects were displayed individually, with each team bringing one project to display; however, in more recent years, this has shifted towards an "overall" presentation, allowing each project in the individual program time in the spotlight. This conference is usually located at the Hot Springs Convention Center in Hot Springs, Arkansas.

At the end of each EAST Conference, various awards, including the biggest, the Timothy R. Stephenson Founders Award, are given to recognize the programs that are determined by a panel of judges to be superior, and the winning schools receive monetary and technological rewards for their efforts.

Research 
The EAST model is grounded in solid pedagogical theory related to the use of technology as a catalyst for learning, collaborative learning, and performance-based learning. In the EAST model:

 The use of technology promotes collaboration, higher order thinking, and problem solving.
 Professional development is an important component of the education technology program.
 Technology is effectively integrated into the curriculum.
 Students independently select appropriate technology tools to obtain, analyze, synthesize and assimilate information.
 Home/school connections are enhanced through the use of technology.
 All students have adequate access to technology.
 Teachers encourage students to utilize technology to find and make sense of information.

References 

 http://www.eastconference.org/

External links 
 EAST Initiative

Education in the United States
Non-profit organizations based in Arkansas
1995 establishments in Arkansas